Etsi multa (On The Church in Italy, Germany, and Switzerland) is a papal encyclical that was published by Pope Pius IX on November 21, 1873.

The encyclical stated that there were three campaigns being waged against the Church at the time:

 The Kulturkampf in the German Empire.
 The suppression by the post-unification Italian authorities of the Gregorian University.
 An anticlerical movement in Switzerland, expressed through:
 The expulsion of Gaspard Mermillod, the Vicar Apostolic of Geneva, Switzerland.
 The enforcement of popular election of Catholic clerics in Geneva and to take an oath the Papacy found objectionable.
 Anti-Catholic laws in the Swiss Cantons of Solothurn, Bern, Basel-Landschaft, Aargau and Zurich.
 Suppression of Catholic priests in Jura.

It condemned Freemasonry, which was blamed for the widespread attack on the Catholic Church, accusing it of being "the Synagogue of Satan", an expression taken from Revelations.

See also
 List of encyclicals of Pope Pius IX

References and notes

External links
Text of Etsi multa

Catholicism and Freemasonry
Kulturkampf
19th-century Catholicism
Papal encyclicals
1873 documents
1873 in Christianity
Documents of Pope Pius IX
November 1873 events